Condalia is a genus of spiny shrubs in the tribe Rhamneae of the buckthorn family, Rhamnaceae. It was named for Antonio Condal, an 18th Spanish physician. Members of the genus are native to tropical and subtropical deserts and xeric shrublands in North and South America.

Common names
Condalia species are often referred to as bluewood, purple haw, logwood, or snakewood in English. Some southern hemisphere species are known as "piquillín" or "yuna". The name snakewood is broadly used and does not indicate any particular species.

Taxonomy
Research performed on the members of Condalia usually concerns only the species native to North or South America; taxonomy is determined for only one group of species. As a result, a consensus has not been reached regarding the composition of the genus.

Uses
The amount of research conducted on the economic and medical uses of Condalia species is small. However, biochemical features of this genus are currently being studied.

The fruit of Condalia hookeri are edible, consumed by birds, and can be made into jelly.

Species
 Condalia buxifolia Reissek
 Condalia correllii M.C.Johnst. – Correll's snakewood
 Condalia ericoides (A.Gray) M.C.Johnst. – javelina bush
 Condalia globosa I.M.Johnst. – bitter snakewood (Southwestern United States, northwestern Mexico)
 Condalia hookeri M.C.Johnst. – Brazilian bluewood
 Condalia mexicana Schltdl. - Mexican bluewood
 Condalia microphylla Cav. – piquillín (Argentina)
 Condalia spathulata A.Gray – knifeleaf condalia
 Condalia velutina I.M.Johnst.
 Condalia viridis I.M.Johnst. – green snakewood
 Condalia warnockii M.C.Johnst. – warnock snakewood
 Condalia weberbaeuri Perkins – yana yana

Formerly placed here
 Ziziphus obtusifolia (Hook. ex Torr. & A.Gray) A.Gray (as C. lycioides (A.Gray) Weberb.)

References

 Condalia taxa in the US

 
Rhamnaceae genera
Taxa named by Antonio José Cavanilles